Leopoldo Morín Garza (born November 3, 1990, Celaya, Guanajuato, Mexico), better known as Polo Morín, is a Mexican actor and model.

Early life and education 
Morín was born in Celaya, Guanajuato, Mexico on November 3, 1990. He studied Economics and Business at the Universidad Anáhuac. He studied acting in CasAzul, Casa del Diezmo and in some workshops at his university Universidad Anáhuac.

Career 
Morín began his career as an actor in the series La rosa de Guadalupe in 2010. In 2011 playing Osvaldo a murderer appeared in the episode "Cuidar el amor", the following year won a prize for best performance at the ceremony Bravo Awards 2012. In 2012 participated in the series of MTV entitled Último año, with Martín Barba. In 2013 he participated in the series Como dice el dicho in episode 4 of season 3: "Al mal paso". In that same year it interpreted to a character gay in the series Gossip Girl: Acapulco, in which it had many critics and repercussions after interpreting to that character. In 2014 he was chosen by Juan Osorio to play "Nando" in the telenovela, Mi corazón es tuyo, in 2015 which he won the award "Favorite Actor" at the Kids Choice Awards México. Later in 2014, he debuted in the cinema in the film Fragmented directed by Douglas Elford which was recorded in Mexico in November 2013. In 2015 he recorded the film Sobre tus huellas, which premiered in Mexico in 2016. At the end of 2015 was chosen again by Juan Osorio to participate in the telenovela Sueño de amor, which premiered in Mexico on February 22, 2016, in the telenovela Morín interpreted to a character who suffered of diabetes. At the end of 2016 after auditioning for the casting of the telenovela of El Bienamado, was chosen by Nicandro Díaz González to play the character of Jordi De Ovando.

Personal life 
In December 2016 Morín was involved in a scandal about his sexuality, due to photos that a hacker posted on Morín's Facebook. After this Morin confirmed that the photographs were real and said the following through a Facebook Live:

In the same live, he also revealed that he prefers not to label his sexuality, saying that he is just a person who loves.

Polo came to recognize he and Lambda García were in a relationship but in July 2019 he announced they had broken up.

Filmography

Film

Television roles

Awards and nominations

References

External links 

1990 births
Mexican LGBT actors
LGBT male actors
LGBT dancers
Mexican male telenovela actors
Mexican male television actors
Male actors from Guanajuato
People from Celaya
21st-century Mexican male actors
Living people